Ortwin Runde (born 12 February 1944) is a German politician from the Social Democratic party. He was the First Mayor (Erster Bürgermeister) of the Free and Hanseatic City Hamburg from 1997 to 2001.

Early life and education
Runde was born in Elbing (Elbląg), Danzig-Westpreußen. After receiving his high-school diploma in 1964, Runde studied Economics and Sociology at the universities of Münster and Hamburg. He received his diploma in Sociology in 1969. He entered public service in Hamburg in 1970.

Political career
Runde joined the Social Democratic Party (SPD) in 1968, and was member of in the state executive of the youth organizations of the SPD (Young Socialists in the SPD) from 1969 to 1971. In 1978 he became one of deputy chairman of Hamburg's SPD, from 1983 to 1988 he was chairman of Hamburg's SPD.

From 1974 to 1988 he was elected as a member of Hamburg's city assembly (Hamburger Bürgerschaft).

From 1988 to 1993 he was senator (as the official title in Hamburg is) of the department for labour, health and social welfare, from 1993 to 1997 of the treasury department.

After Henning Voscherau (SPD) stepped down after internal arguments which whom a political coalition should formed, Runde was elected as First Mayor of the Free and Hanseatic City Hamburg on November 12, 1997. In the next election four years later, the coalition of SPD and the Green Party lost its majority, and therefore Runde had to leave his office as mayor as well on October 31, 2001.

Since 2002, Runde has been a member of the German parliament, the Bundestag.

Personal life
Ortwin Runde is married and has two children.

References

External links

 Website of Ortwin Runde 
 Biography at German Bundestag 

1944 births
Living people
Mayors of Hamburg
People from Elbląg
People from East Prussia
Members of the Bundestag for Hamburg
Members of the Bundestag 2005–2009
Members of the Bundestag 2002–2005
Members of the Bundestag for the Social Democratic Party of Germany